Live in Concert is a 1999 live album and DVD by Natalie Merchant.  The album and DVD were recorded at the Neil Simon Theatre in New York City. The setlist includes a rare cover of David Bowie's "Space Oddity".  The U.S. release is HDCD encoded, but without "peak extension".

Track listing

CD
All songs written by Natalie Merchant, except where noted.
"Wonder"
"San Andreas Fault"
"Beloved Wife"
"Space Oddity" (David Bowie)
"Carnival"
"Dust Bowl" (Merchant, Robert Buck)
"After the Gold Rush" (Neil Young)
"Gun Shy"
"The Gulf of Araby" (Katell Keineg)
"Ophelia"
"Seven Years"
"These Are Days" (Bonus track - Japan only)

DVD
"Life Is Sweet (partial)"
"Ophelia"
"Wonder"
"San Andreas Fault"
"Beloved Wife"
"Senor Don Gato"
"Space Oddity"
"Carnival"
"Break Your Heart"
"These Are Days"
"The Gulf of Araby"
"Waterbound"

Personnel
Adapted from AllMusic.
Natalie Merchant - vocals, piano
Erik Della Penna - guitars
Gabriel Gordon - guitars, backing vocals
Peter Yanowitz - drums
Graham Maby - bass
Elizabeth Steen - keyboards
Doug Stringer - percussion
Susan McKeown - guest vocals

References

Natalie Merchant albums
1999 live albums
Live video albums
1999 video albums
Elektra Records video albums
Elektra Records live albums